Paul Round (born 24 September 1963) is a former professional rugby league footballer who played in the 1980s and 1990s.

Background 
Paul Round's birth was registered in St. Helens, Lancashire, England.

Playing career

Challenge Cup Final appearances
Paul Round played as an  interchange/substitute, i.e. number 14, and scored a try in St. Helens' 18–19 defeat by Halifax in the 1987 Challenge Cup Final during the 1986–87 season at Wembley Stadium, London on Saturday 2 May 1987.

County Cup Final appearances
Paul Round played right-, i.e. number 12, in St. Helens 28–16 victory over Wigan in the 1984 Lancashire County Cup Final during the 1984–85 season at Central Park, Wigan on Sunday 28 October 1984.

References

External links
Profile at saints.org.uk
Statistics at orl-heritagetrust.org.uk

1963 births
Living people
Bradford Bulls players
Castleford Tigers players
English rugby league players
Halifax R.L.F.C. players
Oldham R.L.F.C. players
Rugby league players from St Helens, Merseyside
Rugby league second-rows
Rugby league props
St Helens R.F.C. players
Wakefield Trinity players